The Philippine Senate Committee on Foreign Relations is a standing committee of the Senate of the Philippines.

Jurisdiction 
According to the Rules of the Senate, the committee handles all matters relating to:

 Relations of the Philippines with other nations generally
 Diplomatic and consular services
 The Association of Southeast Asian Nations (ASEAN)
 The United Nations Organization and its agencies
 Multi-lateral organizations
 All international agreements, obligations and contracts of the Philippines
 Overseas Filipinos

Members, 18th Congress 
Based on the Rules of the Senate, the Senate Committee on Foreign Relations has 15 members.

The President Pro Tempore, the Majority Floor Leader, and the Minority Floor Leader are ex officio members.

Here are the members of the committee in the 18th Congress as of September 24, 2020:

Committee secretary: Putli Suharni C. Samanodi-Candao

See also 

 List of Philippine Senate committees

References 

Foreign
Parliamentary committees on Foreign Affairs
Foreign relations of the Philippines